Knight Lake is a lake in geographic Lee Township in the Unorganized West Part of Timiskaming District, in northeastern Ontario, Canada. The lake is in the James Bay drainage basin and the nearest community is Sesekinika,  to the east.

There are three unnamed inflows at the south, northwest and north. The primary outflow, at the east, is an unnamed creek that flows to Sarsfield Creek between the outflow from Sarsfield Lake upstream and the inflow of Tomwool Creek downstream. Sarsfield Creek flows via Meyers Lake, Woollings Creek, the Whiteclay River, the Black River, the Abitibi River and the Moose River to James Bay.

References

Other map sources:

Lakes of Timiskaming District